Sedilia sedilia is an extinct species of sea snail, a marine gastropod mollusk in the family Drilliidae.

Description

Distribution
This extinct marine species was found in Quaternary strata of Florida, and the Pliocene of North Carolina, USA

References

 Dall, William Healey. Contributions to the Tertiary fauna of Florida: with Especial Reference to the Miocene Silex-Beds of Tampa and the Pliocene Beds of the Caloosahatchie River. Vol. 3. Wagner Free Institute of Science, 1890.

External links
 North Carolina Museum of Natural Sciences, Online Collections: Sedilia sedilia

sedilia
Taxa named by William Healey Dall
Gastropods described in 1890